Kangaroo Head is a headland in the Australian state of  South Australia located at the north-west tip of Dudley Peninsula on Kangaroo Island.  It was named by the British explorer, Matthew Flinders, on 23 March 1802.

Description
Kangaroo Head is the north-west tip of Dudley Peninsula on Kangaroo Island and overlooks Nepean Bay to the west, Investigator Strait to the north and Backstairs Passage to the east. It is the termination for a pair of coastlines - one extending from Cape Willoughby in the east via Backstairs Passage and the other extending from Strawbridge Point in the south via Nepean Bay. Since 2002, it has been located within the gazetted locality of Kangaroo Head.

Formation, geology & oceanography 
Kangaroo Head was formed when the sea reached its present level 7,500 years ago after sea levels started to rise at the start of the Holocene.
The cliff line which includes Kangaroo Head consists of a grey metasandstone belonging to the Kanmantoo group bedrock known as the Tananappa Formation.  

History

Aboriginal use
As of 1999, the literature had not cited any archaeological discoveries specific to Aboriginal use of land in the immediate vicinity of Kangaroo Head.

European discovery
Kangaroo Head was discovered and named by Matthew Flinders on 23 March 1802.  This place was where Flinders first sighted Mount Lofty, the tallest peak in the Mount Lofty Ranges.

Economic activity
As of 2014, the land adjoining Kangaroo Head is used for farming.  Farming activity at the locality had been underway prior to 1945 when most of the land had been reported as being cleared of native vegetation.

See also
Kangaroo (disambiguation)

References

Headlands of Kangaroo Island
Dudley Peninsula
Backstairs Passage